The Greek Catholic Cathedral Church of Virgin Mary's Birth is located at Moyzesova Street in the historic centre of Košice, Slovakia. It is the cathedral of the Eparchy of Košice.

Greek Catholics started to settle in Košice in the 17th century. As late as 1852 their bishop established a chapel in Košice. Till then, the divine services were served in the Franciscan Church, and rarely at the Premonstrates or in St. Michael Chapel.

In 1880, the community were able to buy grounds near the chapel and to build the church in the years 1882–1898.

In the Communist era of former Czechoslovakia, the church was given to the Eastern Orthodox Church after the banning of the Greek Catholic (Byzantine Catholic) Church. After 1990, it was returned to the Greek Catholics and the church was restored and repaired to its current condition.

Gallery

See also 
 Slovak Greek Catholic Church
 Eparchy of Košice

External links 
 The Greek Catholic Church in Slovakia
  Gréckokatolícka eparchia Košice – biskupská katedrála or here

Churches in Košice
Roman Catholic churches completed in 1898
Eastern Catholic cathedrals in Slovakia
1898 establishments in Austria-Hungary
Slovak Greek Catholic cathedrals
Slovak Greek Catholic Church
19th-century Roman Catholic church buildings in Slovakia